Combeite is a rare silicate mineral with the formula Na2Ca2Si3O9. It has a trigonal crystal system.

Discovery and occurrence
It was first described in 1957 for an occurrence in nephelinite lavas and tephra on Mount Nyiragongo, Goma, Kivu, Democratic Republic of Congo (then Zaïre). It has also been reported from the Bellerberg volcano in Ettringen, Germany and the Oldoinyo Lengai volcano, Tanzania.  It was named for Arthur Delmar Combe of the Geological Survey of Uganda.

It is associated with götzenite at Mount Shaheru, Congo; and with wollastonite, clinopyroxene, nepheline, melilite, titanian garnet and titanian magnetite at Oldoinyo Lengai.

References 

Sodium minerals
Calcium minerals
Cyclosilicates
Trigonal minerals
Minerals in space group 152 or 154